Intikhab (8 May 1994 – 22 May 2016) was an American-bred racehorse who was trained in both the United Kingdom and Dubai. His reputation rested on wide margin victories in the Diomed Stakes at Epsom and the Queen Anne Stakes at Royal Ascot in June 1998. Although he never won (or even contested) a Group One race that season, his two wins were impressive enough to make him one of the highest-rated horses in the world. He later became a successful breeding stallion, siring the multiple Group One winner Snow Fairy and the leading miler Red Evie.

References

External links
 Intikhab profile on the Godolphin website

1994 racehorse births
2016 racehorse deaths
Racehorses bred in the United States
Racehorses trained in the United Kingdom
Thoroughbred family 8-h